Rebel Highway was a short-lived revival of American International Pictures created and produced by Lou Arkoff, the son of Samuel Z. Arkoff, and Debra Hill for the Showtime network in 1994. The concept was a 10-week series of 1950s "drive-in classic" B-movies remade "with a '90s edge". The impetus for the series, according to Arkoff was, "what it would be like if you made Rebel Without a Cause today. It would be more lurid, sexier, and much more dangerous, and you definitely would have had Natalie Wood's top off".

Originally, Arkoff wanted to call the series, Raging Hormones but Showtime decided on Rebel Highway instead. Arkoff and Hill invited several directors to pick a title from one of Samuel Arkoff's films, hire their own writers and create a story that could resemble the original if they wanted. In addition, they had the right to a final cut and to select their own director of photography and the editor. Each director was given a $1.3 million budget and 12 days to shoot it with a cast of young, up and coming actors and actresses. According to Arkoff, the appeal to directors was that, "They weren't hampered by big studios saying, 'You can't do this or that.' And all the directors paid very close attention to the detail of the era. We want these shows to be fun for the younger generation and fun for the older generation".

The series premiered with Robert Rodriguez's Roadracers on July 22, 1994.

Films
Roadracers - Directed by Robert Rodriguez and starring David Arquette and Salma Hayek.
Confessions of a Sorority Girl - Directed by Uli Edel and starring Jamie Luner, Brian Bloom and Alyssa Milano.
Motorcycle Gang - Directed by John Milius and starring Gerald McRaney, Carla Gugino, and Jake Busey.
Runaway Daughters - Directed by Joe Dante and starring Julie Bowen and Paul Rudd.
Girls in Prison - Directed by John McNaughton, written by Samuel Fuller and Christa Lang and starring Anne Heche, Jon Polito and Ione Skye.
Shake, Rattle and Rock! - Directed by Allan Arkush and starring Renée Zellweger and Howie Mandel.
Dragstrip Girl - Directed by Mary Lambert and starring Mark Dacascos, Traci Lords, Raymond Cruz  and Natasha Gregson Wagner.
Jailbreakers - Directed by William Friedkin and starring Antonio Sabato Jr., Adrien Brody and Shannen Doherty.
Cool and the Crazy - Directed by Ralph Bakshi and starring Jared Leto and Alicia Silverstone.
Reform School Girl - Directed by Jonathan Kaplan and starring Aimee Graham and Matt LeBlanc.

Soundtrack

The soundtrack featured contemporary artists covering classic songs from the 1950s.

Reception
In his review for Entertainment Weekly, Ken Tucker wrote, "It is the whimsical notion behind the Rebel Highway series to take a group of mostly grade-D exploitation films from the '50s and remake them, with good actors and directors, in the '90s". In his review for the Chicago Reader, Jonathan Rosenbaum wrote that the series "is at best a collection of offbeat so-called B-films, though given the state of American movies at the moment this is a much more sizable achievement than it might at first appear–especially considering that the whole system that once supported B-films no longer exists".

References

External links

1994 American television series debuts
1994 American television series endings
American International Pictures films
Film series introduced in 1994
 
Showtime (TV network) original programming
Television series created by Debra Hill
Television series by Miramax Television